Cyperus elegans, the royal flatsedge, is a sedge species in the genus Cyperus from Central and South America.

See also 
 List of flora of the Sonoran Desert Region by common name

References

External links 

elegans
Plants described in 1753
Taxa named by Carl Linnaeus
Flora of Central America
Flora of South America